Melika Balali (Persian:ملیکا بلالی; born 27 December 1999) is an Iranian-born Scottish wrestler, who won the British championship gold medals. Besides her wrestling career, she is a poet and painter who talks about women's rights in her work. 

In July 2022, she became a British champion in freestyle wrestling and protested the compulsory hijab on the first platform, by raising a sign that read, "stop forcing hijab, I have the right to be a wrestler".

Biography 
Melika Balali was born on 27 December 1999 in Shahr-e Kord in Chaharmahal and Bakhtiari Province, where she was also raised. In childhood, art and literature were her passion. She won the best poster design award at the Made in Arkansas Film Festival, for the short film "Limit" (2017) directed by Javad Dararei.

In 2019, she moved to the United States, and then later moved to Scotland where she started wrestling. She always loved freestyle wrestling but because of Islamic rules that govern Iran and patriarchy and force compulsory hijab any women don't have the right to do freestyle wrestling in Iran and they can't participate in International tournaments.

In her poems, she talks about poets and prisoners and women's rights; and illustrates women's suffering under gender discriminatory laws.

Balali received death threats in June 2022 after protesting against the compulsory hijab, which resulted in Police Scotland implementing security measures for Balali after an investigation.

References

Living people

1999 births
British women's rights activists
Scottish people of Iranian descent
People from Chaharmahal and Bakhtiari Province
21st-century Scottish poets
21st-century Scottish painters
Scottish female wrestlers